Saltangará is a village in the Faroe Islands, on the island of Eysturoy.

Saltangará was founded in 1846 and is situated on the eastern side of Eysturoys Skalafjordur-inlet between Rituvík and Søldarfjørður.

The name is derived from three words: angar comes from the Old Norse angr which means a fjord or bay; á means a stream; and salt has the same meaning in Faroese, Icelandic and English.

The village is located in Runavík Municipality along with Æðuvík, Glyvur, Runavík, Rituvík, Skipanes, Søldarfjørdur, Elduvík, Funningsfjørdur, Glyvrar, Oyndarfjørdur, Skáli, Skálafjørdur, Lambi and Lambareidi.

Notable people 
 Jústinus Hansen, footballer
 Jens Martin Knudsen, footballer
 Petur Knudsen, footballer

See also
 List of towns in the Faroe Islands

References

External links
Faroeislands.dk: Saltangará

Populated places in the Faroe Islands